Kepler-30 is a star in the northern constellation of Lyra. It is located at the celestial coordinates: 
Right Ascension  Declination . With an apparent visual magnitude of 15.5, this star is too faint to be seen with the naked eye.
Kepler-30 is exhibiting a strong starspot activity.

Planetary system
Three planets of Kepler-30 were detected by the transit method in 2011. 
The planets are strongly interacting each other, with transit times variability exceeding one hour for each consecutive orbit. Due irregularity of orbits, confirmation of planetary system was delayed until 2012. 
The planetary periods are close to 1:2:5 orbital resonance but are not resonant, producing an extremely complex orbital dynamics.

References

Lyra (constellation)
K-type main-sequence stars
806
Planetary transit variables
Planetary systems with three confirmed planets
J19010807+3856502